KLDY (1280 AM) is a radio station licensed to Lacey, Washington, United States. The station is currently owned by Iglesia Pentecostal Víspera del Fin.

Previous logo

References

External links

LDY
Lacey, Washington
Radio stations established in 1983